Katharina Huber (born 3 October 1995) is an Austrian World Cup alpine ski racer and specializes in the technical events, with a focus on slalom.  She made her World Cup debut in November 2015.

Huber represented Austria at the 2022 Winter Olympics in slalom and combined, and at two World Championships.

World Cup results

Season standings

Top ten finishes
0 podiums; 4 top tens

World Championship results

Olympic results

References

External links

Living people
1995 births
Austrian female alpine skiers
Olympic alpine skiers of Austria
Alpine skiers at the 2022 Winter Olympics
Medalists at the 2022 Winter Olympics
Olympic medalists in alpine skiing
Olympic gold medalists for Austria
20th-century Austrian women
21st-century Austrian women